RMS Aurania was an ocean liner owned by the Cunard Line. She was built in 1916 at Wallsend and measured 13,936 gross register tons.

The Aurania was the last of three ships planned to serve between Canada and Europe. Although ordered in December 1913, because of the First World War, she was not completed until 1916.

The Aurania was launched on 16 July 1916 and was immediately fitted out as a troopship. She made her maiden voyage from the Tyne to New York on 28 March 1917 and on her return sailed to Liverpool. The ship remained on hire to the British Government for the remainder of her career and was used exclusively on the North Atlantic, primarily moving troops and supplies. On 3 February 1918, she left Liverpool and was routed around the coast of Northern Ireland, bound for New York. On the following morning, she was some 15 miles north-west of Inistrahull, off the coast of Donegal, when she was hit by a torpedo from German submarine UB-67. Nine crew members were killed in the explosion. A trawler took the ship in tow but she became stranded near Tobermory on the Isle of Mull, Scotland. Rough seas soon broke Aurania up and she was declared a total loss.

References

External links

Ships of the Cunard Line
Passenger ships of the United Kingdom
Troop ships of the United Kingdom
Ships sunk by German submarines in World War I
World War I shipwrecks in the Atlantic Ocean
World War I passenger ships of the United Kingdom
Maritime incidents in 1918
1916 ships
Shipwrecks of Scotland
Ships built by Swan Hunter